Betty Rides was founded in 1993 by designer and women's snowboard apparel industry pioneer, Janet Freeman. The company is based in Portland, Oregon and manufactures women's snowboarding outerwear, gloves, hats, and streetwear. The company has a number of professional and amateur riders from around the world, including Olga Smeshlivaya, Charlotte Trundle, Danika Duffy, Taylor Bacci, Madeline Baker, Julianne Brackett, Karly Shorr, and Alex Fitch (2011-2012 team).)

Freeman originally began creating outerwear in response to her sister's request for women's snowboard pants, as there were no women's pants at the time. Then, Freeman was making men's snowboard pants, under the brand name "TON A WAWA", and instead began making women's snowboard apparel. Betty Rides remains independently owned and is the only remaining independently owned women's specific snowboard apparel brand.

Freeman got the name for the company from a surfer friend in the 90's, and added "Rides" to make it trademark specific and unique.

In 2010, Betty Rides is expanding their product line to women's specific snowboards.

See also
 List of companies based in Oregon

References

Companies based in Portland, Oregon
Snowboarding
Privately held companies based in Oregon
Companies established in 1993
1993 establishments in Oregon